They Were Ten is a 1961 Israeli film.

Premise
The establishment of a nineteenth-century settlement in Palestine by ten Russian Jews.

References

External links
They Were Ten at IMDB
They Were Ten at TCMDB
They Were Ten trailer
They Were Ten at Israel Film Centre
They Were Ten at Letterbox DVD

1961 in film